6 Guns is a 2010 American Western film. 

Six Guns may also refer to:

Six-Guns, a 2011 video game
Albuquerque Six-Guns, a defunct hockey team

See also
Six shooter (disambiguation)